The province of Bengkulu in Indonesia is divided into regencies which in turn are divided administratively into districts or kecamatan.

The districts of Bengkulu with the regency each falls into are as follows:

 Air Besi, Bengkulu Utara
 Air Dikit, Mukomuko
 Air Manjunto, Mukomuko
 Air Napal, Bengkulu Utara
 Air Nipis, Bengkulu Selatan
 Air Padang, Bengkulu Utara
 Air Periukan, Seluma
 Air Rami, Mukomuko
 Amen, Lebong
 Arga Makmur, Bengkulu Utara
 Arma Jaya, Bengkulu Utara
 Bang Haji, Bengkulu Tengah
 Batik Nau, Bengkulu Utara
 Bermani Ilir, Kepahiang
 Bermani Ulu Raya, Rejang Lebong
 Bermani Ulu, Rejang Lebong
 Binduriang, Rejang Lebong
 Bingin Kuning, Lebong
 Bunga Mas, Bengkulu Selatan
 Curup Selatan, Rejang Lebong
 Curup Tengah, Rejang Lebong
 Curup Timur, Rejang Lebong
 Curup Utara, Rejang Lebong
 Curup, Rejang Lebong
 Enggano, Bengkulu Utara
 Gading Cempaka, Bengkulu
 Giri Mulya, Bengkulu Utara
 Hulu Palik, Bengkulu Utara
 Ilir Talo, Seluma
 Kabawetan, Kepahiang
 Kampung Melayu, Bengkulu
 Karang Tinggi, Bengkulu Tengah
 Kaur Selatan, Kaur
 Kaur Tengah, Kaur
 Kaur Utara, Kaur
 Kedurang Hilir, Bengkulu Selatan
 Kedurang, Bengkulu Selatan
 Kelam Tengah, Kaur
 Kepahiang, Kepahiang
 Kerkap, Bengkulu Utara
 Ketahun, Bengkulu Utara
 Kinal, Kaur
 Kota Padang, Rejang Lebong
 Lebong Atas, Lebong
 Lebong Sakti, Lebong
 Lebong Selatan, Lebong
 Lebong Tengah, Lebong
 Lebong Utara, Lebong
 Luas, Kaur
 Lubuk Pinang, Mukomuko
 Lubuk Sandi, Seluma
 Lungkang Kule, Kaur
 Maje, Kaur
 Malin Deman, Mukomuko
 Manna, Bengkulu Selatan
 Merigi Kelindang, Bengkulu Tengah
 Merigi Sakti, Bengkulu Tengah
 Merigi, Kepahiang
 Muara Aman, Lebong
 Muara Bangkahulu, Bengkulu
 Muara Kemumu, Kepahiang
 Muara Sahung, Kaur
 Mukomuko Selatan, Mukomuko
 Mukomuko Utara, Mukomuko
 Napal Putih, Bengkulu Utara
 Nasal, Kaur
 Padang Bano, Lebong
 Padang Guci Hilir, Kaur
 Padang Guci Hulu, Kaur
 Padang Jaya, Bengkulu Utara
 Padang Ulak Tanding, Rejang Lebong
 Pagar Jati, Bengkulu Tengah
 Pasar Manna, Bengkulu Selatan
 Pelabai, Lebong
 Pematang Tiga, Bengkulu Tengah
 Penarik, Mukomuko
 Pinang Belapis, Lebong
 Pino, Bengkulu Selatan
 Pinoraya, Bengkulu Selatan
 Pondok Kelapa, Bengkulu Tengah
 Pondok Kubang, Bengkulu Tengah
 Pondok Suguh, Mukomuko
 Putri Hijau, Bengkulu Utara
 Ratu Agung, Bengkulu
 Ratu Samban, Bengkulu
 Rimbo Pengadang, Lebong
 Seberang Musi, Kepahiang
 Seginim, Bengkulu Selatan
 Selagan Raya, Mukomuko
 Selebar, Bengkulu
 Seluma Barat, Seluma
 Seluma Selatan, Seluma
 Seluma Timur, Seluma
 Seluma Utara, Seluma
 Seluma, Seluma
 Selupu Rejang, Rejang Lebong
 Semidang Alas Maras, Seluma
 Semidang Alas, Seluma
 Semidang Gumai, Kaur
 Sindang Beliti Ilir, Rejang Lebong
 Sindang Beliti Ulu, Rejang Lebong
 Sindang Dataran, Rejang Lebong
 Sindang Kelingi, Rejang Lebong
 Sukaraja, Seluma
 Sungai Rumbai, Mukomuko
 Sungai Serut, Bengkulu
 Taba Penanjung, Bengkulu Tengah
 Talang Empat, Bengkulu Tengah
 Talo Kecil, Seluma
 Talo, Seluma
 Tanjung Agung Palik, Bengkulu Utara
 Tanjung Kemuning, Kaur
 Tebat Karai, Kepahiang
 Teluk Segara, Bengkulu
 Teramang Jaya, Mukomuko
 Teras Terunjam, Mukomuko
 Tetap, Kaur
 Topos, Lebong
 Ujan Mas, Kepahiang
 Ulu Manna, Bengkulu Selatan
 Ulu Talo, Seluma
 Uram Jaya, Lebong
 V Koto, Mukomuko
 XIV Koto, Mukomuko

 
Bengkulu

id:Kategori:Kecamatan di Bengkulu